Ballo is an Italian dance form during the fifteenth century.

Ballo may also refer to:
 Oumar Ballo (basketball) a Malian college basketball player
 Oumar Ballo, a Malian footballer 
 Olav Gunnar Ballo, a Norwegian former politician